Beacon House and Grove Cottage are grade II listed buildings in Hadley Green Road, Monken Hadley.

Beacon House is an eight-bedroom part timber-framed house built between the late 17th and early 18th centuries extending to approximately 5,000 square feet.

References 

Grade II listed buildings in the London Borough of Barnet
Houses in the London Borough of Barnet
Monken Hadley